Jane I. Rignel St. John ARRC (June 16, 1884 – April 1, 1977) was a United States Army nurse who was the Chief Nurse of Mobile Hospital No. 2 during World War I. For her heroism she was awarded the French Croix de Guerre, the British Royal Red Cross, and the United States Silver Star medal.

Early life, education, and early career 
Jane I Rignel was born in Lockport, New York. She graduated from Columbia University Presbyterian School of Nursing in 1913.

After graduation, Rignel went to work at Western Electric Company plant in New York City where she established a workmen's compensation health aid station.

World War I 
World War I hospitals were often organized around civilian hospitals. In May 1917, Rignel joined the Army Nurse Corps. as Chief Nurse of Mobile No. 2 Hospital which was primarily staffed by personnel from the Presbyterian Hospital in New York.

On August 14, 1918, General John J. Pershing sent a commendation to the whole staff of Mobile Hospital No. 2 to recognize them for their courage under fire. For her heroism she was awarded the French Croix de Guerre, the British Royal Red Cross, and the United States Silver Star medal.

World War II 
During World War II, St. John was the assistant director of the Nurse's Aide Corps of the New York Chapter of the American Red Cross.

Family life 
Rignel married Captain Fordyce B. St. John, the commander of Mobile Hospital 2, in 1919. The St. John's lived in Manhattan, New York and Woodstock, Vermont. Fordyce St. John, a professor of surgery at Columbia University, died in 1973.

Death and legacy 
St. John died in April 1977 in New York at 92 years old.

References 

Military personnel from New York City
World War I nurses
American nurses
American women nurses
1977 deaths
1884 births
Associate Members of the Royal Red Cross